Modern school can refer to:

Francisco Ferrer related
 Ferrer Modern School movement, an early 20th century libertarian education model popularized by the anarchist Francisco Ferrer
 Escuela Moderna (Spanish for "modern school"), the name of Ferrer's school in Barcelona
 New York Ferrer Modern School, a prominent school under Ferrer's model in the United States, later moved to New Jersey
 The Modern School Movement (book), a 1980 history book by Paul Avrich about the American Ferrer school

Artistic movements
 Al-Madrasa al-Ḥadītha ('The Modern School' in Arabic), a modernist literary movement that began in 1917 in Egypt

Other uses
 Freinet Modern School Movement (Mouvement de l'École moderne), an international education movement based on the ideas of French educator Célestin Freinet
 Secondary modern school, a type of secondary school that existed in Great Britain from 1944 until the early 1970s

Specific schools
 Modern School, Lucknow, a K–12 day school in Lucknow, India
 Modern School, Nagpur, a K–12 day school in Nagpur, India
 Modern School (New Delhi),  a private, day-cum-boarding school in New Delhi, India